John "Jimmie" William Crutchfield (March 25, 1910 – April 1, 1993) was a professional baseball outfielder in Negro league baseball from 1930 to 1945.

Career
Crutchfield began his career with the Birmingham Black Barons in 1930 but the following year moved to the Indianapolis ABC's. When the team ran into financial difficulties, he left to play with the Pittsburgh Crawfords, where he remained for the next five years. Teamed with Ted Page and Cool Papa Bell, they formed what is considered the best outfield in the Negro leagues.  During this time, his performance earned him three appearances in the East-West All-Star game. In the 1935 game, Crutchfield made an astonishing catch when he chased down a long drive and leapt in the air, catching the ball in his bare hand. In 1941 he was named an All-Star again, this time as a member of the Chicago American Giants.

Crutchfield served in the military during World War II from 1943 to 1944. After his baseball career was over, he went to work for the United States Postal Service.

Crutchfield died in Chicago in 1993 and was interred in the nearby Burr Oak Cemetery, Alsip, Illinois, buried in an unmarked grave until 2004 when Peoria, Illinois anesthesiologist Jeremy Krock contacted members of the Society for American Baseball Research to try to get a proper headstone on the grave of Crutchfield, who originally comes from the same town as Krock. This launched the Negro Leagues Baseball Grave Marker Project of which Dr. Krock still works with today.

References

External links
 and Baseball-Reference Black Baseball stats and Seamheads
Negro League Baseball Player's Association

1910 births
1993 deaths
Birmingham Black Barons players
Indianapolis ABCs (1931–1933) players
Pittsburgh Crawfords players
Chicago American Giants players
Cleveland Buckeyes players
Homestead Grays players
Newark Eagles players
Toledo Crawfords players
People from Macon County, Missouri
Baseball players from Missouri
African-American baseball players
Burials at Burr Oak Cemetery
African Americans in World War II
United States Army personnel of World War II
African-American United States Army personnel